The Dutch Eredivisie in the 1968–69 season was contested by 18 teams. Feijenoord won the championship.

Teams

A total of 18 teams are taking part in the league.

Managers

League standings

Results

Relegation play-offs
Since FC Volendam, AZ '67 and DOS had an equal number of points at the end of the competition, extra matches were played.

See also
 1968–69 Eerste Divisie
 1968–69 Tweede Divisie

References

 Eredivisie official website - info on all seasons 
 RSSSF
 De Telegraaf 08-14-1968

Eredivisie seasons
Netherlands
1968–69 in Dutch football